Stelio Nardin (26 August 1939 – 11 August 2014) was an Italian footballer who played as a defender.

Club career
Nardin is best known for his time with Napoli where he made 135 appearances; he also played for U.S. Catanzaro 1929 and Casertana Calcio.

International career
Nardin won one international cap for Italy in a 1–1 draw against Portugal in a friendly held on 27 March 1967.

References

1939 births
2014 deaths
People from Gorizia
Italian footballers
Association football defenders
Italy international footballers
S.S.C. Napoli players
U.S. Catanzaro 1929 players
Serie A players
Footballers from Friuli Venezia Giulia